Cris Cheek (born 1955) is a British multimodal poet and scholar. He began his career working alongside Bill Griffiths and Bob Cobbing at the Poetry Society printshop in London and with the Writers Forum group, who met with regularity on the premises in Earls Court. During that time they co-founded a poetry performance group known as jgjgjgjgjgjgjg . . .(as long as you can say it that's our name) with Lawrence Upton and Clive Fencott. Subsequently cris collaborated on electronic music improvisations with "bang crash wallop" and released several cassettes through Balsam Flex. In 1981, he was a co-founder of Chisenhale Dance Space.

His music and sound collaborations include Slant (a trio with Philip Jeck and Sianed Jones). His radio program "Music of Madagascar" produced for BBC Radio 3 won a Sony Gold Specialist Award (now Radio Academy Awards) in 1995. He taught performance writing courses at Dartington College of Arts, where he became a research fellow in interdisciplinary text (2000–2002). A large body of interdisciplinary performance writing was produced in collaboration with Kirsten Lavers under the author function Things Not Worth Keeping between 1999 and 2007. In 2005, he became a professor at Miami University in Ohio. He was Altman Fellow in The Humanities Center at Miami University in 2011 and 2012, co-presenting the Networks and Power symposium and a conference on Network Archaeology, from which an issue of the online journal Amodern, co-edited with Nicole Starosielski and Braxton Soderman, was published. From 2017 to 2019 he worked alongside Mack Hagood to develop and produce the inaugural season of the Phantom Power podcast.

Early life
Cheek was born in Enfield Town, London and educated at Highgate School, graduating in 1972. He worked at the printshop of the Consortium of London Presses in the basement of the Earls Court premises of the National Poetry Centre between 1975 and 1977. He earned a PhD in poetry writing from Lancaster University.

Career 
Initially, cris helped Bill Griffiths and Bob Cobbing to produce in-house volumes of Poetry Review under the editorship of Eric Mottram. They became print shop manager in 1977, among a wave of poets in London following the lead of the British Poetry Revival whose poetry integrates spatial, sonic and semantic performative concerns. Early live performance work was in duet with Clive Fencott and then a trio with the addition of Lawrence Upton as "JGJGJJGJG (as long as you can say it that's our name)." They were, on occasion, joined by Bill Griffiths and Jeremy Adler. He ran several small press imprints and edited the short-lived magazine RAWZ. Through work with Jacky Lansley and Fergus Early on their production I Giselle, cheek became involved with X6 Dance Space and then Chisenhale Dance Space. cris later collaborated with Mary Prestidge, Kirstie Simson, Miranda Tufnell and Dennis Greenwood, Patricia Bardi, Michael Clark and Sue MacLennan between 1982 and 1986. In 1987, cheek and Sianed Jones traveled to Egypt, Kenya, Tanzania and Madagascar researching into social forms of music and dance.

Personal life
Cheek lived in Hackney and Canning Town between 1981 and 1994. Whilst working for dance and performance artists and improvising music groups, he began writing songs with Sianed Jones, performing and recording with Philip Jeck as Slant. Slant released three albums. Jones and Cheek later moved to Lowestoft. He was an active member of poetics e-list communities for the following twenty years. During this time, he taught performance writing at Dartington College of Arts, working alongside Caroline Bergvall as well as many others. cheek also made contemporary vaudeville shows with folk musician Chris Foster that toured to village halls and community centers around England.

While working at the Dartington College of Arts, Cheek began teaching with and subsequently working with Kirsten Lavers to produce a substantial web of projects under the author function Thinks Not Worth Keeping, shortened to TNWK.

cris was in a relationship, subsequently married to Erin E. Edwards and then divorced between 2012 and 2021. cris lived in Cincinnati, before moving to Labastide-Rouairoux in Tarn, southern France in the summer of 2022.

Bibliography 
cheek's creative writing works include:
a present. London: Bluff Books, 1980
Mud. London: London: Spanner/Open Field, 1984
Cloud Eyes. London: Microbrigade, 1991
Skin upon skin. Lowestoft: CD, Sound & Language, 1996
Stranger. Lowestoft: Sound & Language, 1996
Songs from Navigation. Hastings: book+CD, Reality Street, 1998
the church, the school, the beer. Oxford, Ohio: Critical Documents, 2007
part: short life housing. Toronto: The Gig, 2009
Pickles & Jams. Buffalo: BlazeVOX, 2017

His works have been published in various magazines, literary miscellanies and anthologies, including:
Anthology of Twentieth-Century British and Irish Poetry.Oxford University Press, 2001
Other: British and Irish Poetry since 1970. Middletown, CT: Wesleyan University Press, 1999
The L=A=N=G=U=A=G=E Book. Carbondale: Southern Indiana University, 1984
Conductors of Chaos. Picador: London, 1996
Floating Capital. Elmwood, Connecticut: Poets & Poets Press, 1991

MC, CD and CD-R
Crayon (NY), Widemouth (Baltimore)
Little Magazine (Albany)
Balsam Flex (London)

Critical articles
Bob Cobbing’s Performances: of Production and Circulation. Journal of British and Irish Innovative Poetry, 2012. Canterbury: Gylphi, 2012. Volume 4. Number 2
Reading and Writing: the Sites of Performance.
Giving Tongue. Assembling Alternatives: Reading Postmodern Poetries Transnationally Middletown, CT: Wesleyan University Press, 2003
Sky Tails: An Encryption of Dispersal. published in Removed for Further Study: The Poetry of Tom Raworth, Toronto: The Gig, 2003
Implicit. Additional Apparitions: Poetry, Performance and Site Specificity Sheffield: The Cherry On the Top Press, 2002

External links 
 Entry at The Archive of the Now
 Entry at PennSound
 Entry at the British Electronic Poetry Centre

Further reading 
 Peter Barry, Poetry Wars: British Poetry of the 1970s and the Battle of Earls Court (Cambridge: Salt Publishing, 2006)
 Andy Brown, Binary Myths: Conversations with Contemporary Poets (Exeter, Stride, 1998)
 Andrew Duncan, The Failure of Conservatism in Modern British Poetry (2003)
 http://media.sas.upenn.edu/pennsound/groups/radioradio/04_cris-cheek_Radio-Radio_NY_2003.mp3

References 

Writing teachers
Miami University faculty
Living people
English male poets
1955 births
People from Enfield, London
Alumni of Lancaster University
Poets from Ohio